Spot Image, a public limited company created in 1982 by the French Space Agency, Centre National d'Etudes Spatiales (CNES), the IGN, and Space Manufacturers (Matra, Alcatel, SSC, etc.) is a subsidiary of Airbus Defence and Space (99%). The company is the commercial operator for the SPOT Earth observation satellites.

Network and partners 
Spot Image is a worldwide distributor of products and services using imagery from Earth observation satellites and works through a network of subsidiaries, local offices (Australia, Brazil, China, United States, Japan, Peru, Singapore), and partners. The goal is to provide on-the-spot service with worldwide availability.

Spot Image works with a network of more than 30 direct receiving stations handling images acquired by the SPOT satellites.

Spot Image collaborates with ESA's GMES programme, shares geographic information with the OGC and contributes to the interoperability of web services; with Infoterra Global it continues to offer services for precision-agriculture.

Satellites 

The 3 SPOT satellites in orbit (Spot  5, 6, and 7) provide images with a large choice of resolutions – from 2.5 m to 10 m. Spot Image also distributes multiresolution data from other optical satellites, in particular from Formosat-2 (Taiwan) and Kompsat-2 (South Korea), for which it has exclusive distribution rights, and from radar satellites (TerraSAR-X, ERS, Envisat, Radarsat). Spot Image is also  the exclusive distributor of data from the very-high resolution Pleiades satellites. The launch of Pléiades-1, via a Soyuz rocket, was confirmed on December 16, 2011.  The second (Pléiades-2) was launched mid-2012.  Spot Image also offers infrastructures for receiving and processing, as well as added value options.

Products 
In addition to images, Spot Image proposes innovative added-value products to meet new user-needs:
 ortho-images (SPOTView ortho) whose location accuracy is less than 10 m RMS
 homogeneous territorial coverage, orthorectified (SPOTMaps), which come in natural colours with 2.5 m resolution
 3D products (SPOT DEM) built from automatic correlation of stereoscopic pairs acquired by SPOT 5's HRS (Haute Résolution Stéréoscopique, High Resolution Stereoscopic) instrument

Among the services offered by Spot File:
 Programming of SPOT satellites: direct-access satellite programming and regular revisit capability over the same point on the globe enable the acquisition of images over a selected area of interest.
 The SPOT archives: more than 18 million images of the whole world, collected by SPOT satellites since 1986, are archived and accessible on line, offering recent or historical geographic information.
	
On-line services:
 SPOTGallery giving the general public access to images chosen for aesthetic, cultural or thematic reasons,
 In partnership with Google Earth, ’One World, One Year‘ offers the best images from the SPOT satellites whose acquisition data is not more than one year old, for almost the entire planet.

Planet Action, an initiative launched by Spot Image 
Its goal is to encourage the Earth observation industry and geographic information professionals to support local projects searching for adaptive solutions to climate change problems.  The products and materials available to these professionals – satellite images, geographic information systems, image processing and display software – are indispensable for studying the impact of global warming on our planet, on local and global scales.
Planet Action supports projects that study:
 the impact on populations and habitat
 droughts, desertification and water resources
 vegetation, biodiversity and ecosystems,
 the oceans
 ice, glaciers and snow cover

Planet Action Web Site

Important dates 

 1982: Creation of Spot Image in Toulouse, France
 1983: Creation of Spot Image Corporation in the United States
 1986: Launch of the SPOT 1 satellite
 1990: Creation of Spot Imaging Services in Australia
 1990: Launch of the SPOT 2 satellite
 1991: Creation of Spot Asia in Singapore
 1998: Creation of Beijing Spot Image in China
 1998: Launch of SPOT 4
 2002: Creation of Tokyo Spot Image
 2002: Launch of SPOT 5
 2004: Opening of offices in Brazil and Mexico
 2004: Signing of a contract with the NSPO for the distribution of data from the Formosat-2 satellite
 2005: Signing of a contract with KARI for the distribution of data from the Kompsat-2 satellite
 2006: Opening of an office in Peru
 2008: Spot Image is 81% owned by Astrium Services, an EADS company
 2008: Spot Image Brasil replaces the office opened in this country
 2012 : Launch of SPOT 6
 2014 : Launch of SPOT 7

See also 

 SPOT (satellites)
 CNES
 EADS

External links 
 Spot Image Web Site
 CNES Official Web Site
 EADS Official Web Site
 Astrium Official Web Site

Remote sensing companies
Companies based in Toulouse
Aerospace companies of France